Jason Burnham (born 8 May 1973) is an English footballer, who played as a full back in the Football League for Northampton Town and Chester City.

References

Chester City F.C. players
Northampton Town F.C. players
Worcester City F.C. players
Association football fullbacks
English Football League players
1973 births
Living people
Footballers from Mansfield
English footballers